Claude C. Lilly III is an American educator, insurance executive, and academic administrator that served as the 17th president of Presbyterian College in Clinton, South Carolina.

Early life and education 
Lilly received his bachelors, masters, and doctoral degrees from Georgia State University, the latter in risk management.

Career

Teaching and administrative positions
Lilly has held teaching positions at multiple institutions, including Texas Tech University, the University of Southern California, and Florida State University. He served as the Dean of the College of Business Administration at the University of North Carolina at Charlotte, and as the Dean of the College of Business and Behavioral Science at Clemson University before accepting the top job at Presbyterian.

During Lilly's time at Clemson, he served as the chair of the Charlotte Branch of the Federal Reserve Bank of Richmond.

Presidency of Presbyterian College
It was announced on June 15, 2012, that Lilly had been unanimously elected by the Presbyterian College board of trustees to serve as the college's next president. Lilly assumed office on July 15, 2012, succeeding John V. Griffith.

During his presidency, Lilly led an $11.8 million campaign to renovate Neville Hall, the college's main academic building. He also led the "swift response" to the flooding of a dormitory on campus, and oversaw the graduation of the first two classes from Presbyterian's School of Pharmacy.

It was announced on June 9, 2015, that Lilly had been elected to serve as the vice president of the Big South Conference.

On June 30, 2015, Lilly informed the college that he would resign as president effective July 15, 2015. He did not give a reason for this decision. His term ended three years to the day from taking office, and he was succeeded by Bob Staton.

Personal life
Lilly has two children.

References

Living people
American academic administrators
Presbyterian College faculty
Presidents of Presbyterian College
Year of birth missing (living people)
Georgia State University alumni